Grafenwöhr (Northern Bavarian: Groafawehr) is a town in the district of Neustadt an der Waldnaab, in the region of the Upper Palatinate in eastern Bavaria, Germany. It is widely known for the United States Army military installation and training area, called Grafenwoehr Training Area (Tower Barracks), located directly south and west of the town.

History

Early history

The town of Grafenwöhr (Island of the Count), was founded in the 9th century on an island (wöhr), located between the river Creussen and the Thum stream. In its early history, the inhabitants and the town of Grafenwöhr proper belonged to nobles from Schweinfurt, Bamberg, and Leuchtenberg.

20th century

In 1907, Prince Luitpold, regent of the Kingdom of Bavaria, selected the area near  the town of Grafenwöhr as the place best suited for training of the Bavarian Army (1806–1919). The first artillery round was fired in the training area at 08:00 on 30 June 1910. Throughout World War I (1914–1918) the Grafenwöhr training area was used for equipping and training army units for combat. After the War, the High Command, Berlin, used Grafenwöhr to train the 100,000–man German army, allowed by the Treaty of Versailles (1919). 

On 5 and 8 April 1945, the training camp and the town of Grafenwöhr proper were bombed during Allied air raids. The last German Army Commander of the Grafenwöhr training area surrendered to the U.S. Army on 20 April 1945. Afterwards, during the Cold War (1945–1991), the Grafenwöhr training area was an important, combined arms training site for the U.S. Army and allied forces.

Post Cold War

The military installation is also home to one of the largest Army construction projects in Europe, called Efficient Basing-Grafenwöhr. The Grafenwöhr Training Area (Tower Barracks) houses the 7th Army Joint Multinational Training Command (JMTC). The 7th Army JMTC owns almost all of the U.S. Army training facilities and assets in Europe. The Grafenwöhr Training Area is one of its largest training areas and includes ranges that can accommodate nearly every weapons system currently used. 

Though operated by the U.S. Army, the area is the largest multinational training area in Europe. Grafenwöhr Training Area is (Tower Barracks), also known as the East Camp, is the main post and is located on the north east edge of the training area. The Vilseck military community, also known as Rose Barracks, or the South Camp, is on the southern boundary.

The Grafenwöhr Army Airfield provides air flow to all air traffic requesting services including but not limited C-130's from the 37th Airlift Squadron at Ramstein AB, Germany. The airfield is staffed 24 hours a day by advisory services and at a minimum from 08:00 to 17:00 by air traffic controllers both in a control tower and an approach control. Due to its length and relative proximity to the JMTC training area, it makes for a realistic simulation of short field operations encountered around the world. Bunker dropzone is also located within the Grafenwöhr Training Area. It is used to practice airdrop of troops, equipment, and supplies.

Geography
The civilian town of Grafenwöhr rests nestled between low hills. The area is widely forested and the nearby region is mostly used for agricultural purposes. Farms and dairies cover much of the surrounding landscape. Grafenwöhr is positioned geographically such that it experiences very mild summers and cold winters.

Climate
Climate in this area has mild differences between highs and lows, and there is adequate rainfall year-round.  The Köppen Climate Classification subtype for this climate is "Cfb" (Marine West Coast Climate/Oceanic climate).

Sports
 Soccer: SV Grafenwöhr. The adults and children mostly all are in either the Kreisliga or Bezirksoberliga.
 Fishing: The area around Grafenwöhr is excellent for fishing. There are many lakes on the training area and the surrounding area that are fished. Common fish landed in the area are Carp, Pike, Rainbow Trout, and Brown Trout.
 Hunting: The area around Grafenwöhr is heavily forested and provides for excellent hunting. Wild boar (Wildschwein), roe deer (Reh) and red deer (Rotwild) are the most commonly hunted animals.
 Other: The U.S. Military hosts a wide variety of sports within the boundaries of the camps.

Transport

 Road: Grafenwöhr is located along Bundesstrasse B299. Civilian transportation to, from, in, and around Grafenwöhr is limited to the automobile. There are a limited number of taxi and bus services available.
 Rail: The only railroad in Grafenwöhr is strictly for military use and transport only. However, there are several rail stations nearby where civilian passenger trains run. The closest Bahnhofs (rail stations) are Pressath, Schwarzenbach, Freihung, and Vilseck.
 Air: The only airfield in Grafenwöhr is strictly for military use and transport only. The closest international airport is located in Nuremberg, approximately 90 kilometers away.

VIPs and important visitors

 Prince Luitpold, (1821-1912), gave the approval to build the training area on December 9, 1906. 
 Elvis Presley, (1935-1977), was on the military training place from November 3, 1958, for six weeks while he was doing his military service, then visited the base on four occasions, two in 1959, and two in 1960

Media

American Forces Network (AFN) Bavaria broadcasts from the Grafenwöhr Training Area.
Bavarian Times Magazine provides news, shopping, dining and other information about the Grafenwohr area. The Bavarian Times is a military magazine for the Grafenwöhr Training Area

Photo gallery

References

External links

 Bob Decker's site includes a couple of stylized maps showing Graf
 7th Army JMTC website
 Grafenwöhr the home of the U.S. Seventh Army for 60 years
 "Elvis in der Oberpfalz" (german)

Neustadt an der Waldnaab (district)